The Men's sprint event of the FIS Nordic World Ski Championships 2017 was held on 23 February 2017.

Results

Qualification
The qualification was held at 15:50.

Quarterfinals
The quarterfinals were started at 17:58. The top two placed and the two fastest skiers not placed first or second in their heat, qualified for the semifinals.

Quarterfinal 1

Quarterfinal 2

Quarterfinal 3

Quarterfinal 4

Quarterfinal 5

Semifinals
The semifinals were started at 18:40. The top two placed and the two fastest skiers not placed first or second in their heat, qualified for the final.

Semifinal 1

Semifinal 2

Final
The final was started at 19:07.

References

Men's sprint